Kamuro Dam is a gravity dam located in Yamagata Prefecture in Japan. The dam is used for flood control and water supply. The catchment area of the dam is 22.5 km2. The dam impounds about 40  ha of land when full and can store 7400 thousand cubic meters of water. The construction of the dam was started on 1977 and completed in 1993.

References

Dams in Yamagata Prefecture
1993 establishments in Japan